Hermann Josef von Kuhl (2 November 1856 – 4 November 1958) was a Prussian military officer, member of the German General Staff, and a Generalleutnant during World War I. One of the most competent commanders in the German Army, he retired in 1919 to write a number of critically acclaimed essays on the war. Hermann von Kuhl is one of only three recipients to be distinguished with both the "military class" and  "peace class" of the Pour le Mérite, Prussia's and Germany's highest honor.

Pre-war period 
Hermann Kuhl was born in Koblenz, Rheinpreußen (Rhenish Prussia), the son of a professor of philosophy at the Jülich Progymnasium. He studied philosophy, classical philology, German studies and comparative linguistics at the Universities of Leipzig, Tübingen, Marburg and Berlin. In 1878 he received his D.Phil. from Tübingen magna cum laude with the dissertation De Saliorum Carminibus. During his studies, he was a member of the University of Leipzig's singing group St. Pauli.

On 1 October 1878 he joined the 5th Westphalian Infantry Regiment No. 53 – Köln as a cadet. He was promoted to Leutnant in 1879 and Oberleutnant in 1889 when he competed in the entrance examination for the Prussian Military Academy where he studied from 1889 to 1892. Winning appointment to the General Staff he was seconded to the Staff for six months before becoming a company commander in Grenadier Regiment Nr. 3 in Königsberg East Prussia.

Finally in 1897 he returned to the Prussian Military Academy in Berlin as an instructor and concurrently served as a member of the Third Department of the General Staff, which monitored France, Britain, and the Low Countries. The intelligence from this department was essential for the development of Feldmarschall Alfred Graf von Schlieffen's Plan. Kuhl's career flourished because he met the high standards of the demanding Schlieffen, who predicted that he would become a "great captain of the future". In 1899 he was promoted to Major and married. He learned much participating in Schleiffen's staff rides and war games.  After Schlieffen's retirement Kuhl became head of the Third Department and was promoted to lieutenant colonel and then colonel.    His first major publication, on Bonaparte's Campaign of 1796, appeared in 1902.

Further promotion depended on further command experience, so the new Chief of the General Staff Helmuth von Moltke persuaded the Kaiser's War Cabinet to appoint him to command the 25th Infantry Brigade Münster. A day later, on 4 June 1912 Kuhl was promoted to Generalmajor. A year later during the 25th anniversary celebration of the reign of Kaiser Wilhelm II he was knighted and thereby became von Kuhl. On 1 January 1914 he returned to the General Staff as an Oberquartiermeister.

World War I 
At the outbreak of World War I on 2 August 1914, von Kuhl became Chief of Staff in General Alexander von Kluck's First Army which was the crucial right flank of the swinging door in the Schlieffen Plan.   Kluck regarded him as  a notable man, of most energetic character and wide views. Mentally and physically he was imperturbable, and, in addition to an extremely cultivated mind, he possessed a personal bravery on the battlefield which from time to time evoked a caution from the Army Commander.  By adroit staff planning they squeezed their 320,000 men through a  strip of land between Liege and the Dutch border.  Pivoting down into France they swept back the British Expeditionary Force. Shortly thereafter they had reached the Marne River and were transferring men to their right flank to fend off a French thrust from Paris.  With the tip of the Eiffel Tower on the horizon, they were sure that "complete victory beckoned" Nonetheless they were ordered to retreat because of concern about the gap between their right flank and the German Second Army  abandoning the Schlieffen Plan. Kuhl always maintained that the retreat was a disastrous, unnecessary failure of nerve. He was promoted to Generalleutnant on 18 April 1915.   On 22 September in that same year, he became chief of staff in General Max von Fabeck's Twelfth Army, which was shifted to the Eastern Front.  Next starting on 24 November 1915 he served in the same capacity in the Sixth Army on the Western Front, which was commanded by General Crown Prince Rupprecht of Bavaria. Rupprecht's prewar career was in the Bavarian Army. For exemplary service during the Battle of the Somme Kuhl received the Pour le Mérite on 28 August 1916.

At the end of August 1916 Rupprecht was given command of Army Group Crown Prince Rupprecht (German: Heeresgruppe "Kronprinz Rupprecht) with Kuhl as chief of staff. Rupprecht was one of four senior members of German royal families who were appointed army group commanders; he was regarded as difficult: according to Chief of the General Staff Erich von Falkenhayn: "One minute he is extraordinarily optimistic, the next terribly down.", which made Kuhl especially important.  The Army Group was responsible for the Ypres Salient; their major challenge was to funnel in the reserves to counter the British attacks. Kuhl received the Kingdom of Bavaria's highest purely military honor, the Military Order of Max Joseph, on 13 December 1916. By then Field Marshal Paul von Hindenburg and General Erich Ludendorff had taken command.  In 1917 the Germans again fought bitter defensive battles in the west, while in the east they drove the Russians out of the war.

Hence at the beginning of 1918 they outnumbered their opponents in the west and they were determined to attack for victory.  Kuhl's proposal for an attack on the vital British railroads in Flanders was accepted, but while waiting for the ground to dry there, in March 1918 they smashed through the southern British front near Cambrai, using troops from the two armies on the southern flank of Army Group Rupprecht.  Their success was so overwhelming that they extended the attack, but failed to separate the French and British armies and depleted resources intended for Flanders.  When they did attack there they smashed through the British and Portuguese lines, but were stopped short of their strategic goal.  To drain allied reserves from Flanders, the Germans shifted direction to hit the French in the south, once again shredding through their opponents lines, but failing to smash their will to resist.  The Germans were about to attack again in Flanders so Kuhl, Rupprecht and their artillery commanders were meeting with Ludendorff to finalize the plans for the opening barrage when they learned by telephone that a joint French and American assault had shredded the German flank in the south. As Rupprecht wrote in his diary "no doubt we have passed the high point of this year's achievements". They all realized that they lacked the resources for continuing their attacks, so they went on the defensive.

After their defeat at the Battle of Amiens on 11 August 1918, Rupprecht and his staff recognized that Germany's position had become hopeless.  Their headquarters had moved to Tournai (24 April 1918), now they retreated to Mons (2 September 1918) and finally to Brussels (17 October 1918), reflecting the long withdrawal from the Western Front and the final collapse of the German Army.  Rupprecht resigned his post on 11 November 1918. For the march back to Germany, the Army Group was designated "A" (German: Heeresgruppe A) and Kuhl was made General der Infanterie to oversee its orderly demobilization. Following this final military assignment, he retired.

Post-war period 
In retirement, von Kuhl published books and numerous essays, articles and reviews about leadership problems on the Western Front during the war. He discussed the Schlieffen Plan in 1920, in an article written for general readers entitled Why did the Marne Campaign Fail? This sparked a debate concerning German strategy that continued throughout the 1920s and early 1930s, and again in the 1950s. Perhaps his most popular book in its day was The German General Staff in the Preparation and Conduct of the World War (1920), republished several times. He also wrote an essay The World War in the Judgment of our Enemies (1922). He was a member of the commission to oversee the publication of the official German history of the war. A string of notable works was capped in 1929 when he published Weltkrieg 1914–1918, two extensive volumes covering the entire war, which firmly established his reputation as a historian.

In the 1920s von Kuhl was appointed to the Historical Commission of the Reich Archives and gave evidence to the Weimar Republic's Parliamentary inquiries on the reasons for the military collapse of 1918. In his testimony, von Kuhl concluded  The German offensive of spring 1918 had to battle with severe challenges... The mobility of the army was limited. Front-line units were gradually exhausted, while the enemy's combat power grew substantially through the arrival of the Americans and through the new means of combat – the tank.  This stands in contrast to General Erich Ludendorff who spent his post-war years promoting a Far Right stab-in-the-back legend that blamed the German defeat without an honorable peace on Marxists and Republicans at home. Military historian Hans Meier-Welcker summed up von Kuhl this way  For a deep historical understanding of the world war, even if not free of temporal apology, he performed a significant contribution.

For his postwar work, von Kuhl was awarded the Pour le Mérite für Wissenschaften und Künste (English: Order of Merit in the Sciences and Arts) in 1924, Germany's highest civilian decoration. Hermann von Kuhl spent his last few years living with his nephew in Frankfurt am Main. He died there on 4 November 1958 at the age of 102, quite possibly the last surviving German World War I general.

Awards 
 Pour le Mérite, 28 August 1916  (one of the few recipients of both the "military class" and the "civil class")
 Oak leaves to the Pour le Mérite, 20 December 1916 
 Commander of the Military Order of Max Joseph (Bavaria, 13 December 1916)
 Order of the Red Eagle, Knight 2nd Class with Oak Leaves and Swords, 12 January 1918
 Order of the Crown, 1st class with Swords (Prussia, 22 March 1918)
 Pour le Mérite for Sciences and Arts for his historical studies (5 December 1924)
 Naming of a street in Koblenz: Von-Kuhl-Straße

Dates of ranks
 Fähnrich—1 October 1878
 Leutnant—12 January 1879
 Oberleutnant—16 February 1889
 Hauptmann—14 September 1892
 Major—13 September 1899
 Oberstleutnant—10 April 1906
 Oberst—24 March 1909
 Generalmajor—4 June 1912
 Generalleutnant—18 April 1915
 General der Infanterie—18 November 1918

Works by von Kuhl 
 Der deutsche Generalstab in Vorbereitung und Durchführung des Weltkrieges. Mittler, Berlin 1920 (online).
 Der Marnefeldzug 1914. Mittler, Berlin 1921 (online).
 Ursachen des Zusammenbruchs: Entstehung, Durchführung und Zusammenbruch der Offensive von 1918. Hobbing, Berlin 1923.
 "Unity of Command Among the Central Powers" in: Foreign Affairs September, 1923 (online) at foreignaffairs.com
 Der Weltkrieg 1914–1918. Dem deutschen Volke dargestellt. 2 Bände. Tradition W. Kolk, Berlin 1929.
 with General [Walter Friedrich Adolf] von Bergmann, Movements and Supply of the German First Army During August and September, 1914 (Fort Leavenworth: Command and General Staff School Press, 1929). (Online).

References

Literature 
 Hans Meier-Welcker: "General der Infanterie v. Kuhl 96 Jahre alt". In: Wehrwissenschaftlche Rundschau. Band 2, 1952, Heft 11, p. 550.

External links

 Literature by and about Hermann von Kuhl in the Catalog of the German National Library
 

1856 births
1958 deaths
Military personnel from Koblenz
19th-century Prussian people
20th-century Prussian people
Generals of Infantry (Prussia)
German people of World War I
German Army generals of World War I
Generals of Infantry (Reichswehr)
Recipients of the Pour le Mérite (military class)
Recipients of the Pour le Mérite (civil class)
Commanders of the Military Order of Max Joseph
German military historians
German centenarians
People from the Rhine Province
German male non-fiction writers
Men centenarians